"Do You Wanna Touch Me", also referred to as "Do You Wanna Touch Me? (Oh Yeah)" is a song by English glam rock singer Gary Glitter, written by Glitter with Mike Leander and produced by Leander. It was released as the lead single from his second studio album, Touch Me (1973), peaking at No. 2 on the UK Singles Chart in January 1973, his third successive UK hit. The single also reached No. 9 in Ireland and No. 11 in Australia. The song represented something of a departure from the "trademark" of the Glitter sound. The song was also used in the Runaways drama film of the same name.

Joan Jett version

"Do You Wanna Touch Me (Oh Yeah)" was later covered by rock singer Joan Jett in 1980 for her debut solo studio album, Bad Reputation (1981).  Following the success of "I Love Rock 'n' Roll" nearly two years later, the song was released as a single in the summer of 1982 and reached No. 20 on the Billboard Hot 100 that September. In Canada, the song spent two weeks at No. 8.

Jett's version of the song appears in the 2000 episode of Freaks and Geeks titled "We've Got Spirit" and a 2008 TV commercial for Hewlett-Packard's TouchSmart computers. The commercial was withdrawn when the company learned that Glitter, now a convicted sex offender, had written the song. On 29 October 2008, it was reported that Glitter would receive £100,000 in royalties from Hewlett-Packard for the advertisement.

Track listings and formats
 7" and 12" vinyl
 "Do You Wanna Touch Me (Oh Yeah)"  – 3:24
 "Victim of Circumstance"  – 2:54
 US 12" vinyl promo
 "Do You Wanna Touch Me (Oh Yeah)"  – 3:39
 "Summertime Blues"  – 2:23
 Australian and New Zealand 12" vinyl
 "Do You Wanna Touch Me (Oh Yeah)"  – 3:24
 "Victim of Circumstance"  – 2:54
 "Summertime Blues"  – 2:16
 Brazilian and Greek 7" vinyl
 "Do You Wanna Touch Me (Oh Yeah)"  – 3:24
 "Bad Reputation"  – 2:48
 Ireland, Spain and United Kingdom 7" vinyl
 "Do You Wanna Touch Me (Oh Yeah)"  – 3:24
 "Jezebel"  – 3:25  (UK release labeled as "Jezebel," but actual cut was "Bad Reputation")
 Mexican 7" vinyl
 "Do You Wanna Touch Me (Oh Yeah)"  – 3:24
 "Wooly Bully"  – 2:18

Credits and personnel
Credits and personnel are adapted from the Bad Reputation album liner notes.
 Joan Jett – vocals, guitar, backing vocals
 Gary Glitter – writer
 Mike Leander – writer
 Lea Hart – guitar, backing vocals
 Kenny Laguna – piano, backing vocals, producer
 John Earle – saxophone
 Paul Simmons – drums, backing vocals
 Jeff Peters – bass, backing vocals
 Ritchie Cordell – backing vocals, producer
 John Earle – saxophone
 Mark Dodson – engineer, associate producer
 Butch Yates – assistant engineer
 Malcolm Davis – mastering

Chart performance

Weekly charts

Year-end charts

Release history

Glee cover controversy
In 2011, the song was covered by Gwyneth Paltrow and other cast members for season 2 episode 15 "Sexy" of the musical television series Glee, Holly Holliday. The performance caused some controversy in the UK over the resulting royalty payments to Glitter, who was by then a convicted sex offender. The charity Kidscape described the song's inclusion as "wholly inappropriate". The UK version of the album Glee: The Music, Volume 5 does not therefore include the song, but replaces it with the cover of "Afternoon Delight" by Starland Vocal Band.

Cover by the Cure
The Cure played this song several times during the Head Tour in 1985.

See also
 "Oh Yeah!", a Green Day song that samples Jett's version of the song.

References

External links
 
 

1973 singles
1982 singles
Gary Glitter songs
Joan Jett songs
Gwyneth Paltrow songs
Songs written by Mike Leander
Song recordings produced by Mike Leander
Songs written by Gary Glitter
Bell Records singles
1973 songs